NokScoot Airlines Company Limited (commonly referred to as NokScoot) was a Thailand-based low-cost airline, operating medium to long-haul international services out of Bangkok's Don Mueang International Airport. On 26 June 2020, the airline ceased its operation and was liquidated as a result of the COVID-19 pandemic.

History
On 16 December 2013, Scoot announced the signing of a memorandum of understanding with Nok Air to establish a new carrier in Bangkok, operating on medium and long-haul routes with a fleet of Boeing 777-200 aircraft. NokScoot is a joint venture of Thailand's Nok Air and Singapore based Scoot. The airline has operated commercial flights out of Don Mueang International Airport since 20 May 2015. Nok Air owns 51% of NokScoot, with Scoot, a subsidiary of Singapore Airlines, owning the remaining 49% – the Thai statutory limit for foreign ownership. The airline had an initial capital of 2 billion baht.

NokScoot went out of business on 26 June 2020 as it could not recover from the effects of the COVID-19 pandemic impact. NokScoot returned three aircraft from the five-jet fleet to the parent company in Singapore by June 2020. The airline company is going to be liquidated after Singapore Airline's low-cost arm Scoot offered to sell its 49 percent shares to Nok Airlines Plc. for a nominal sum of 1 baht, but the offer was not accepted. NokScoot had been unable to record a full year's profit since its inception in 2014. The decision of liquidation left 450 employees out of work.

Destinations
, NokScoot served or has previously served the following destinations (at closure):

Fleet

NokScoot solely operated the Boeing 777-200ER, which were all obtained from Scoot's parent, Singapore Airlines. The first aircraft joined the fleet in November 2014. The airline's livery was a hybrid between its parent airlines Scoot and Nok Air. At the time of liquidation, the NokScoot fleet consisted of the following aircraft:

Cabin
NokScoot's aircraft were operated in a two-class configuration, Scoot Plus and Economy.

Scoot Plus
There are 24 Scoot Plus seats in the airline's Boeing 777s.

Economy
There are 391 Economy seats, arranged to provide three different levels of comfort. As these are bulkhead and exit row seats, there are no seats in front of them to recline back to invade their space, giving them the most legroom in the Economy cabin. Passengers in Standard Economy may reserve seats for a fee, while the fares for Super seats are higher than for Standard Economy seats; passengers choosing S-t-r-e-t-c-h seats will have to pay more compared to the Super Seats. Passengers have to pay for meals in economy, either pre-paid or buy-on board. Passengers must also pay for any checked luggage.

References

External links

Official website

Defunct airlines of Thailand
Airlines established in 2014
2020 disestablishments in Thailand
Airlines disestablished in 2020
Low-cost carriers
Companies based in Bangkok
Thai companies established in 2014
Value Alliance
Airlines disestablished due to the COVID-19 pandemic